Dabu County is a county in Meizhou City, in the east of Guangdong Province, China. A center of Hakka culture, it has a population of 375,000.

Famous natives
This is the ancestral hometown of 1st Guyana President Arthur Chung even though the Indians are the majority of Guyana.

70% of Singapore's 300,000-strong Hakka community are descended from emigrants from Dabu County, including the great-grandfather of Singapore's founding father and first Prime Minister Lee Kuan Yew.

Ethno-linguistic make-up

Dabu is noted for its large Hakka population.

Administrative divisions 
Dabu County has jurisdiction over the following towns:

Huliao 
Gaopi
Chayang 
Dama 
Sanhe
Yinjiang 
Guangde
Taoyuan
Fenglang 
Dadong 
Xihe 
Qingxi
Zhourui 
Baihou

The administrative center of the county was originally in the ancient town of Chayang before moving to Huliao.

Climate

References

External links
Official website of the Dabu government
Yong Mun Sen

 
County-level divisions of Guangdong
Meizhou